Melburn Roobaix is a non-competitive recreational cycling  event organised by FYXO in Victoria, Australia. Cyclists register to ride a course which is only revealed on the day, but is typically  around the inner suburbs of Melbourne, ending at Brunswick Velodrome.
 
According to the organisers:

References

External links

Cycling in Melbourne